Anita Jo is a 1919 German silent crime film directed by Dimitri Buchowetzki and starring Bernhard Goetzke, Charles Willy Kayser, and Hanni Weisse.

Cast

References

Bibliography

External links

1919 films
1919 crime films
German crime films
Films of the Weimar Republic
German silent feature films
Films directed by Dimitri Buchowetzki
German black-and-white films
1910s German films
1910s German-language films